is a 2022 Japanese computer-animated martial arts fantasy adventure film, directed by Tetsuro Kodama, produced by Toei Animation and written by Dragon Ball series creator Akira Toriyama. It is the twenty-first Dragon Ball feature film overall, the fourth produced with Toriyama's direct involvement, the second to carry the Dragon Ball Super branding, and the first to be produced mainly using 3D animation. The film follows Piccolo and his former student Gohan as they go on a mission to save the world from the newly reformed Red Ribbon Army.

The film is the first to introduce a reiteration of Cell after the original Cell Saga. The character who was originally a human base of Android 21 from Dragon Ball FighterZ made a cameo appearance in the film. It was originally set for release in Japan on April 22, 2022, but was instead released on June 11 due to a cyberattack at Toei. It received positive reviews from critics, with praise for the nostalgia, characterization, non-stop fan service, well-animated fight sequences, humor and plot.  The film grossed $86.6 million worldwide, becoming the second-highest grossing Dragon Ball film to date.

This is the first Dragon Ball film since 1996 to not be co-distributed by 20th Century Studios, whose Japanese assets were absorbed by Disney following Disney's acquisition of 21st Century Fox.

Plot
Commander Magenta, CEO of Red Pharmaceuticals, seeks to revive the Red Ribbon Army that his father Commander Red led and was ultimately destroyed by Goku. Magenta and his assistant Staff Officer Carmine seek to recruit Dr. Gero's surviving grandson, Dr. Hedo, a superhero-obsessed mad scientist who was released from jail after serving a lengthy sentence for grave robbery. Hedo accepts the offer, despite his initial reservations, after Magenta convinces him that Capsule Corporation and the Z-Fighters are evil organizations. 

While Goku, Vegeta, and Broly are training under Whis on Beerus' planet, Piccolo is annoyed over Gohan wasting his potential while training the latter's daughter Pan. Piccolo is then attacked by a Red Ribbon android named Gamma 2, but manages to evade the android and follows him to the Red Ribbon Army's base. Piccolo disguises himself as a Red Ribbon soldier to infiltrate a Red Ribbon meeting, learning that Gamma 2 was created by Hedo along with Gamma 1 as superheroes to deal with the Z-Fighters and that Hedo reluctantly used his grandfather's schematics on Cell to create an improved version, known as Cell Max. Piccolo makes a wish from Shenron to unlock his full potential. Piccolo learns of Magenta's scheme to kidnap Pan in order to lure Gohan into a trap. 

Piccolo volunteers himself for the kidnapping party and talks Pan into playing along. Enraged upon learning of his daughter's "abduction", Gohan launches a full-scale assault on the Red Ribbon base and fights Gamma 1. Gohan powers up to his "Ultimate" form during his fight with Gamma 1 while Piccolo discards his disguise to face Gamma 2, with his full potential manifesting in a new form dubbed "Orange Piccolo". Piccolo manages to convince Gamma 2 that Magenta was lying about the Z-Fighters, and the Gammas have a change of heart. Carmine is knocked out by Pan after attempting to kill her, while a furious Magenta runs off to activate Cell Max. 

Cell Max emerges as a giant, rampaging monster, while Bulma arrives with Goten, Trunks, Android 18 and Krillin as reinforcements. Gohan, Piccolo, the Gammas and the other fighters battle Cell Max. Goten and Trunks try to fuse into Gotenks, but their fusion technique is imperfect. However, Gotenks does manage to crack Cell Max's skull, revealing that he does not have a regeneration ability like the original Cell. Gamma 2 sacrifices himself in an attempt to kill Cell Max, but only succeeds in destroying Cell Max's left arm. As Piccolo restrains Cell Max, Gohan's inner rage unleashes a new power and fires a Special Beam Cannon, which kills the enemy. Gohan is reunited with Pan, while a repentant Hedo and Gamma 1 are given positions at Capsule Corporation. 

In a post-credits scene, Vegeta has defeated Goku in a fight.

Voice cast

Production
Production of Super Hero began before the release of Dragon Ball Super: Broly. It is the first film in the franchise to be produced largely in CGI, and the fourth to have heavy involvement from series creator Akira Toriyama, who provided the original concept and character designs. The use of CGI visuals was a decision made by Kodama, who is experienced with using them.

To differentiate the movie from prior films, Piccolo and Gohan were made protagonists (as opposed to Goku and Vegeta) and the Red Ribbon Army were brought back as villains. Toriyama personally designed the characters of the Red Ribbon Army, as well as their vehicles. Kodama explained the narrative would further explore human drama, most notably the idea of Gohan being a warrior and a scholar at the same time. Toriyama said that he wanted the plot to focus on the Gohan-Piccolo relationship, given Piccolo motivates Gohan to fight even more than his father, Goku.

The film introduces new transformations for Gohan and Piccolo. , a form unique to Gohan, is based on the awakening of his powers ("the wild beast", per Toriyama) as a boy. Toriyama attempted to draw Gohan Beast with a "scary face", but finding this did not fit his character, gave him upturned hair as well. , which Toriyama considers Piccolo's first transformation, was made orange and extremely muscled to distinguish him from Piccolo's regular form.

Hiroshi Kamiya and Mamoru Miyano voice the androids Gamma 1 and Gamma 2. Miyu Irino voices their creator, Dr. Hedo. Kamiya was surprised by his casting, as he was a fan of Miyano, and also because the two would be a duo of villains. Despite the similarities of both androids, Kamiya looked forward to potential differences in their personalities, as it would bring an element of surprise to the narrative.

Marketing

Promotion
A sequel to Dragon Ball Super: Broly was officially announced on May 9, 2021. At 2021's San Diego Comic-Con, a short clip of Goku with the film's logo was shown, revealing its title as Dragon Ball Super: Super Hero. Character designs for Piccolo, Pan, Krillin, Gamma 1, and Gamma 2 were also shown, as well as the design of Piccolo's home. The first trailer was released on October 7, 2021. The Japanese release date was announced with a new trailer at Jump Festa 2022.

Novelization
A novelization of the film written by Masatoshi Kusakabe was released on June 14, 2022. In its first week, it sold 3,946 copies, making it the seventh best-selling light novel in Japan.

Release

Theatrical
The film was originally scheduled to be released in Japan on April 22, 2022, but it was postponed to June 11 after Toei Animation was affected by ransomware. The film was released in IMAX, 4DX, Dolby Cinema, and MX4D.

Distribution
The film is distributed in Japan by Toei Company. 20th Century Studios (formerly 20th Century Fox) had no involvement in the distribution of this film as a result of their Japanese division being absorbed into that of Disney's on September 1, 2020 following the latter's acquisition of the former, making this film the first to be released by Toei independently since Dragon Ball: The Path to Power (1996).

Crunchyroll is distributing the film outside Japan with Sony Pictures Entertainment (through Sony Pictures Releasing International), except in North America, where they released it on their own. It was released in theaters worldwide in August and September 2022. This is the first Dragon Ball film to be distributed under the Crunchyroll brand after Sony Pictures acquired Crunchyroll in 2021 and merged it with Funimation in 2022.

Home media
Dragon Ball Super: Super Hero will be release on Blu-ray and DVD on March 14, 2023. The film will feature an English-language dub and original Japanese-language with English subtitles.

Reception

Box office

Japan
Dragon Ball Super: Super Hero topped the Japanese box office on its debut weekend, selling about 498,000 tickets and earning around ¥670 million (about $4.98 million). In its second weekend, the film's gross earned ¥300 million (about $2.2 million), placing it second behind Top Gun: Maverick. After 12 days of release, the film had sold over 1 million tickets. In its third weekend, the film remained in second place, earning about ¥232 million (about $1.71 million) from 166,000 tickets. It had cumulatively sold 1.21 million tickets and earned about ¥1.64 billion (about $12.11 million).

In its fourth weekend of release, Super Hero dropped to fourth place at the box office, earning about ¥155 million (about $1.13 million). In its fifth weekend, the film surpassed the ¥2 billion yen ($15.04 million) mark, although it also dropped to fifth place with earnings of ¥121 million (about $879,900). In its sixth weekend, Super Hero dropped to sixth place, earning about ¥72.4 million (about $523,900). In the film's seventh weekend in theatres, it earned about ¥44.3 million (about $324,600), dropping to 8th place.

Cumulatively, Dragon Ball Super: Super Hero has earned ¥2.3 billion (about US$17.03 million), surpassing The Quintessential Quintuplets Movie to become the fourth-highest grossing Japanese anime film of 2022.

Other territories
In the United States and Canada, Dragon Ball Super: Super Hero was initially projected to gross $13–15 million from 3,130 theaters during its opening weekend. After making $10.74 million on its first day, including $4.3 million from Thursday night previews, estimates were raised to $21–23 million. It went on to debut at $21 million, topping the box office. In its second weekend, the film earned $4.7 million, finishing fifth. Eventually, the film earned $38.1 million, becoming the fourth highest grossing anime film in the United States.

Critical response
  American audiences polled by PostTrak gave the film an 85% overall positive score, with 75% saying they would definitely recommend it, while Japanese audiences on Filmarks, the Japanese survey firm, gave Dragon Ball Super: Super Hero a ranking of 4.0 out of 5.0.

Richard Eisenbeis of Anime News Network gave Super Hero a B−. He noted its extensive callbacks to prior Dragon Ball moments and appreciated its exploration of Piccolo, who he considers a neglected character. He also praised the film's animation. However, Eisenbeis criticized Cell Max for being a lackluster villain. Cezary Jan Strusiewicz of Polygon described the movie as nostalgic, remarking on its accessibility to casual fans and people who have never watched Dragon Ball before. Unlike Eiseinbeis, Strusiewicz disliked the animation, which he found to be unusual for the series.

Notes

References

External links
 
 
 

2022 anime films
2022 computer-animated films
2022 martial arts films
Adventure anime and manga
Akira Toriyama
Super Hero
Fantasy anime and manga
2020s Japanese-language films
Japanese action films
Martial arts anime and manga
Martial arts fantasy films
Toei Animation films
2022 films
Films about genetic engineering
Superheroes in anime and manga
Sony Pictures films
Japanese computer-animated films